The 2001 Akron Zips football team represented Akron University in the 2001 NCAA Division I-A football season; they competed in the Mid-American Conference. They were led by seventh–year head coach Lee Owens. The Zips played their home games at the Rubber Bowl in Akron, Ohio. They were outscored by their opponents 281–360 and finished with a record of 4 wins and 7 losses (4–7).

Schedule

Roster

References

Akron
Akron Zips football seasons
Akron Zips football